The following is a list of notable secondary schools in Mauritius, Rodrigues and the outer islands.

Mauritius

Zone 1(2021)

Zone 2

Zone 3

Zone 4

Rodrigues
Rodrigues College (Mixed), Port Mathurin, Rodrigues

See also 
 Education in Mauritius
 List of tertiary institutions in Mauritius

References

Mauritius

Schools